Halanay inequality is a comparison theorem for differential equations with delay. This inequality and its generalizations have been applied to analyze the stability of delayed differential equations, and in particular, the stability of industrial processes with dead-time and delayed neural networks.

Statement 

Let  be a real number and  be a non-negative number. If  satisfies 

See also 
 Grönwall's inequality

References 

Control theory
Lemmas in analysis
Ordinary differential equations